Keru is a city in Eritrea.

Populated places in Eritrea